The  is one of five active Armies of the Japan Ground Self-Defense Force (JGSDF). It is headquartered at Camp Sapporo in Sapporo, Hokkaidō and its responsibility is the defense of the island of Hokkaidō. It is the largest Army of the JGSDF as on Hokkaidō population and geographic constraints are less limiting than elsewhere in Japan. Most of JGSDF's modern Type 90 tank squadrons are located within the Northern Army's structure.

Organization 

  Northern Army, at Camp Sapporo in Sapporo
  2nd Division, at Camp Asahikawa in Asahikawa, responsible for the defense of North Western Hokkaidō
  5th Brigade, at Camp Obihiro in Obihiro, responsible for the defense of North Eastern Hokkaidō
  7th Division (Armored), at Camp Higashi Chitose in Chitose, responsible for the defense of Southern Hokkaidō
  11th Brigade, at Camp Makomanai in Sapporo, responsible for the defense of South Western Hokkaidō
 1st Artillery Brigade, at Camp Kita Chitose in Chitose
 1st Anti-Aircraft Artillery Brigade, at Camp Higashi Chitose
 1st Anti-Aircraft Artillery Group, at Camp Higashi Chitose (MIM-23 Hawk)
 4th Anti-Aircraft Artillery Group, at Camp Nayoro in Nayoro (MIM-23 Hawk)
 101st Unmanned Aerial Vehicles Battery, at Camp Shizunai in Shinhidaka
 3rd Engineer Brigade, at Camp Eniwa in Eniwa
 12th Engineer Group (Construction), at Camp Iwamizawa in Iwamizawa
 13th Engineer Group (Construction), at Camp Horobetsu in Noboribetsu
 14th Engineer Group (Construction), at Camp Kamifurano in Kamifurano
 105th Equipment Company, at Camp Eniwa in Eniwa
 303rd Vehicle Company, at Camp Eniwa in Eniwa
 Northern Army Combined Brigade (Training), at Camp Higashi Chitose
 52nd Infantry Regiment, at Camp Makomanai in Sapporo 
 1st Basic Training Battalion, at Camp Higashi Chitose
 120th Training Battalion, at Camp Makomanai in Sapporo 
 Cold Weather Combat Training Unit, at Camp Makomanai in Sapporo 
 1st Electronic Warfare Unit (3x Electronic Warfare companies), at Higashi Chitose 
 Northern Army Signal Group (2x Signal battalions), at Camp Sapporo
 Northern Army Aviation Group, at Camp Okadama in Sapporo
 1st Anti-tank Helicopter Battalion, at Camp Obihiro in Obihiro
 Northern Army Helicopter Battalion, in Sapporo
 Northern Army Meteorological Company, in Sapporo
 Logistic Support Battalion, in Sapporo
 Northern Army Logistic Support, at Camp Shimamatsu in Eniwa
 Northern Army Finance Service, at Camp Sapporo
 Northern Army Medical Service, at Camp Makomanai
 Northern Army Band, at Camp Makomanai
 Northern Army Command Post Training Support, at Camp Higashi Chitose
 Northern Army Military Intelligence, at Camp Sapporo
 301st Coastal Observation Unit, in Wakkanai
 302nd Coastal Observation Unit, in Shibetsu
 Northern Army Unmanned Aerial Vehicle Fleet, in Shinhidaka
 Northern Army Movement Surveillance Team, in Kutchan
 Northern Army Ground-to-Ship and Anti-Tank Unit, at Camp Kutchan in Kutchan with 3x platoons with Type 96 Multi-Purpose Missile Systems
 Hokkaidō Logistic Depot, at Camp Shimamatsu, overseeing 10 fuel and ammunition depots on Hokkaido Island

Note: The Japanese Defense Intelligence Headquarters also has a classified SIGINT unit based at Camp Higashi Chitose.

External links
 Northern Army Homepage (Japanese)

Armies of the Japan Ground Self-Defense Force
Military units and formations established in 1952